The 1941 Brown Bears football team was an American football team that represented Brown University in the Ivy League during the 1941 college football season. In its first season under head coach Skip Stahley, Brown compiled a 5–4 record and outscored opponents by a total of 102 to 81. The team played its home games at Brown Stadium in Providence, Rhode Island.

Halfback Bob Margarita was selected by the United Press as a first-team player on the 1941 All-New England football team.  He later played in the National Football League for the Chicago Bears.

Schedule

References

Brown
Brown Bears football seasons
Brown Bears football